Trivikram Srinivas (born Akella Naga Srinivasa Sarma; 7 November 1971), often credited as Trivikram, is an Indian film director and screenwriter who works in Telugu cinema. He is one of the highest-paid directors in South Indian cinema. He has garnered six state Nandi Awards for Best Dialogue Writer and two Filmfare Awards for Best Director. In 2015, he received the BN Reddy National Award for his contribution to Indian cinema.

A university gold medalist with a Master's degree in Nuclear physics, Trivikram initially had no plans to enter the entertainment industry, but his keen interest in film and Telugu literature led him to become a screenwriter, and later a film director. He is popularly known among the Telugu audience by the epithets "Maatala Maantrikudu", and "Guruji". His film craft is identified by its creative and quick-witted dialogue, humorous content, fast-paced repartee mixed with action, mythological references, courtship drama, and issues in relationships. Some of his films are noted for integrating ideas from Hindu philosophy into mainstream popular cinema.

In 2000, he wrote the dialogue for Nuvve Kavali, which won the National Film Award for Best Feature Film in Telugu. His Telugu directorial debut film Nuvve Nuvve (2002) has garnered the Nandi Award for Best Feature Film (Silver). His other writing and directorial works include notable films such as Swayamvaram (1999), Chiru Navvutho (2000), Nuvvu Naaku Nachav (2001), Manmadhudu (2002), Malliswari (2004), Jai Chiranjeeva (2005), Athadu (2005), Jalsa (2008), Khaleja (2010), Julayi (2012), Attarintiki Daredi (2013), S/O Satyamurthy (2015), A Aa (2016), Aravinda Sametha Veera Raghava (2018), and Ala Vaikunthapurramuloo (2020).

Early life
Trivikram Srinivas was born as "Akella Naga Srinivasa Sarma" in a middle class Telugu speaking family, in Bhimavaram, Andhra Pradesh.
During his childhood, he used to watch a lot of films, and thought of becoming a film director at age 14. He however had no plans for a career in films, as he thought it's impractical considering his financial situation was such that even buying a ticket to travel from Bhimavaram to Hyderabad, the hub of Telugu film industry, was itself a big task.

He finished his schooling at S.Ch.B.R.M. High School, and completed Intermediate, and graduated with a Bachelor of Science (B.Sc) degree from D.N.R. College in Bhimavaram. He then moved to the city of Visakhapatnam to study for his Master's degree. In the city he spent every day of his stay, in watching movies; all the while he made sure his parents never knew of his intention to become a film director. He was also an avid reader and was so addicted to reading that he used to get, "a high while reading books". He completed his 2 years M.Sc degree course in Nuclear physics in 1 year  3 months, and graduated with a gold medal from Andhra University.

Trivikram then started to work as a High school teacher in Bhimavaram, teaching Maths, Physics and Chemistry. His friend actor Sunil, who was then struggling for chances in film industry, wanted someone to support him as a source of strength, and requested Trivikram to join him in Hyderabad, to which he obliged. He then started taking classes for students over there, living on the income from tution fee, and spent his spare time in trying to find opportunities for himself to enter film industry.

Career

Early beginnings
Trivikram met writer Kommanapalli Ganapathi Rao, and on his suggestion, published his short story "Road" in Andhra Jyothi, a leading Telugu Weekly. It was his first and only story published so far. Rao liked his writing and assured him of work in the film Merupu, but expressed that producer won't be able to pay for his work. Trivikram then started working for the film, and after 10 days of work, when the shooting of the film shifted to far away location in Gandipet, he disassociated himself from the project, citing lack of money to travel. Actor Gautam Raju, a close friend of Sunil, then helped him in getting an opportunity in the industry. He introduced Trivikram to T. D. V. Prasad, who was then working on the film titled "Akka Bagunnava?". Prasad narrated the story, and said the entire script was complete except for the climax and asked Trivikram to come up with his own version of climax. He then wrote and narrated it. Posani Krishna Murali, one of the established writers, who happened to be present there, was impressed with the writing of Trivikram. However they later lost contact with each other.

He then worked as writer for a film based program, conducted by Gautam Raju, in ETV. Raju connected him once again to Posani, who was then in Chennai. Trivikram then took his remuneration of Rs. 3000/- from ETV and used it to travel to Chennai to meet Posani, who was then writing for the film Pavitra Bandham. After meeting up with Posani, Trivikram was asked if he knew how to write script and dialogues, to which he said yes like an experienced professional, the fact being he didn’t know anything about it at all. Posani then went into another room to attend a phone call, and it was during this time that Trivikram looked into a film script and understood the format of writing scenes/dialogues on paper. He was then given a narration of the story of Pavitra Bandham by Posani, and was asked to come up with his own version of scenes. Impressed by the resultant work, he was employed as a writer, and thus began his writing career. Under the tutelage of Posani, during a stint of 1 year 8 months, Trivikram learned a lot and gained a vast experience in writing for films of all genres. Posani never treated Trivikram as a ghost writer, and always introduced him as his assistant writer or associate writer to others. He introduced him to directors like E. V. V. Satyanarayana, Muthyala Subbaiah and B. Gopal.

1999: Screenwriting debut

Swayamvaram (1999)

Trivikram, who initially had no plans in writing for films, but instead had an interest in directing films, didn't want to settle in his new found role as an assistant or associate writer of others. He met actor Venu, and producer Venkata Shyam Prasad, and narrated the story of Swayamvaram to them. They believed in the gist of his story, which Trivikram condensed into one single dialogue, "Prema ane swargam nundi, 7 adugula dooramlo vunde narakame pelli.". After listening to this dialogue, the director of the film Vijay Bhaskar, insisted that he should write the dialogue for the film. Producer Shyam, overcoming many obstacles and risks, produced and released the film on 22 April, 1999, which then became a hit. The movie marked the official debut of Trivikram as a Screenwriter.

Nuvve Kavali (2000)
Despite the success of Swayamvaram, Trivikram had no interesting offers, and went back to Bhimavaram and lived there for over one and half month. He then received a call from Sravanthi Ravi Kishore, to accompany him to Chennai, for buying the remake rights of Malayalam film Niram. Taking only the essence of the film without its transcript, Trivikram rewrote the entire dialogue afresh, using only one dialogue from the original, "Nuvvendukuraa Naaku mundu I Love You cheppaledu.", as he felt it captures the essence of the film. He added humor with the dialogues and incorporated new characters, including one for his actor friend Sunil. While Nuvve Kavali was getting done, he simultaneously penned the story and dialogues for his next venture Chiru Navvutho. The film Nuvve Kavali released in late 2000, went on to be a huge hit and became the highest grosser of its time.

Other projects

After the success of his first two films as a writer, Swayamvaram (1999) and Nuvve Kavali (2000), Trivikram went on to write the story and dialogue for the following Telugu films; Chiru Navvutho (2000), Nuvvu Naaku Nachav (2001),  Manmadhudu (2002), Malliswari (2004), and Jai Chiranjeeva (2005). He also wrote dialogue for the Telugu film Vasu (2002). Trivikram even penned the lyrics for a song in the film Oka Raju Oka Rani (2003), and sang a portion of the song Computers-u Arts-u Science-u in his directorial debut Nuvve Nuvve (2002). His writings even before he turned into a director set high standards in Telugu films which his contemporaries found tough to match.

2002-2010: Directorial debut and breakthrough

During the filming of Nuvve Kavali, Trivikram narrated the script of Nuvve Nuvve to producer Sravanthi Ravi Kishore, who liked it and asked him if he could direct it. Trivikram accepted the offer and asked for some time as he needed more confidence. He commenced the direction of Nuvve Nuvve, after the release of his another work as writer, Nuvvu Naaku Nachav, in late 2001. Released on 10 October 2002,  Nuvve Nuvve marked the directorial debut of Trivikram. Although the film turned out to be successful at the box office, and received critical acclaim, he wasn't happy with it completely, and felt the writer in him dominated the director in that film.

This was followed by the critically acclaimed film Athadu (2005). Athadu collected a distributor share of 22 crore in its total run, thus becoming a box office hit. Its satellite rights were sold for 4.5 crore. Following upon its initial recognition, the film was dubbed into Tamil, Malayalam, and Hindi, as well as being dubbed into Polish for a release in Poland as a Poszukiwany, becoming the first Telugu film released in Poland.

Trivikram's next directorial Jalsa became the most anticipated film of the year 2008, with a release of 325 prints in 1000 theatres. The film's audio rights were sold to Aditya Music for 90 lakh, the highest for a Telugu film ever at the time. Jalsa became a major hit at box office and was the highest grossing Telugu film of 2008. Jalsa was followed by Khaleja (2010) released on 7 October 2010, for which Trivikram directed Mahesh Babu in two Thums Up soft drink commercials to assist in promoting the film. Khaleja opened to mixed reviews and underperfomred at the box office.

2011-2020: Commercial success and rise to top

Trivikram provided the dialogues and screenplay for the film, Teen Maar (2011), starring Pawan Kalyan and Trisha in a remake of Love Aaj Kal released in March 2011. He then directed Julayi (2012) starring Allu Arjun and Illeana and the film became a box-office hit. Next, he directed Attarintiki Daredi (2013) starring Pawan Kalyan and Samantha. Despite the film's pirated version, which has up to 90 minutes of the film being put up online a few days before its official release, the film became an Industry hit. Attarinitki Daredi received positive reviews from critics according to International Business Times India who called the film a "perfect family entertainer" in their review roundup.

He then directed S/O Satyamurthy (2015) starring Allu Arjun and Samantha. The film was released on 9 April 2015 to a general positive response. On a 40 crore ($6.23 million) budget, S/O Satyamurthy earned a distributor share of 51.9 crore ($8.1 million) and grossed 90.5 crore ($14.1 million). His A Aa (2016) starring Nithin and Samantha became a runaway hit as well. 2018 was a mixed bag for Trivikram, as his Agnyaathavaasi (2018) starring Pawan Kalyan, Keerthy Suresh, and Anu Emmanuel was declared a box office disaster, while his Aravinda Sametha Veera Raghava (2018) starring NTR Jr. and Pooja Hegde became a blockbuster, collecting more than 90 crore distributor share worldwide. His 2020 film Ala Vaikunthapurramuloo (2020) starring Allu Arjun and Pooja Hegde became one of the highest grossing Telugu films of all time, collecting more than 163 crore distributor share worldwide with a gross over 262 crore.

His next project was Bheemla Nayak (2022) for which he wrote the screenplay and dialogues. He is set to work with Mahesh Babu in an as yet untitled film, marking their third collaboration.

Personal life 
In Hyderabad, as a group of aspirants for a career in films, Trivikram, Sunil, R. P. Patnaik, Chandra Siddhartha, Gopimohan, Dasaradh, and Venu all used to meet in the cafe called "Try Luck", and discuss about opportunities in films. Interestingly, they all started getting noticed in film industry only after the cafe went out of business. R. P. Patnaik came to Hyderabad to prepare for civil services, and joined Trivikram, Sunil’s room and stayed with them for many days. Gunasekhar, also stayed with them as their roommate during his struggling days. As of 2016, Trivikram maintains the room, in the Punjagutta neighbourhood, as a memory by paying rent.

Actor Sunil and Trivikram were friends since their early days in Bhimavaram. Both graduated from the same D.N.R. College in Bhimavaram, Trivikram with B.Sc and Sunil with B.Com Fine Arts, both even married on the same day.

In 2002, Trivikram married Soujanya, niece of Telugu lyricist Sirivennela Seetharama Sastry. The couple have two children.

Filmmaking style 
Trivikram's writing is interlaced with original and subtle humour. His films are known for their creative and quick-witted dialogue. Idlebrain.com praised his 2002 directorial debut, Nuvve Nuvve, for "decimating the dullness and the dreariness" plaguing the characterization of actors in then Telugu fims. In early 2005, The Hindu compared Trivikram favourably with popular filmmaker Shankar. Trivikram packs his films with surprise action sequences, and often projects two versions of the same event—appearing at two different junctures in the film—showcasing two different perspectives towards the same incident. The female protagonists in his films ensure majority of the laughs, whereas the male protagonists are guarded about their families and provide security. Issues of self-respect, and relationships-over-money also form major part of his plots. Trivikram felt Telugu film Vaarasudu was emotionally touching and appreciated the cast and makers.

Filmography
Trivikram has directed 11 feature films so far.

Other roles

Frequent collaborators

Awards
Nandi Awards

 Filmfare Awards South

South Indian International Movie Awards

Santosham Film Awards

Other Honours

Allu Ramalingaiah Memorial Award

References

External links

Living people
Telugu screenwriters
Telugu film directors
Indian advertising directors
Telugu-language lyricists
21st-century Indian film directors
1973 births
Slapstick comedians
Filmfare Awards South winners
Nandi Award winners
Andhra University alumni
People from West Godavari district
Film directors from Andhra Pradesh
21st-century Indian dramatists and playwrights
Screenwriters from Andhra Pradesh
21st-century Indian screenwriters